Chaetocnema confinis, the sweetpotato flea beetle, is a species of flea beetle in the family Chrysomelidae. It is found in Africa, the Caribbean, Central America, North America, Oceania, South America, and Southern Asia.

References

Further reading

 
 

Alticini
Articles created by Qbugbot
Beetles described in 1873
Taxa named by George Robert Crotch